Franz Krommer (27 November 1759 in Kamenice u Jihlavy – 8 January 1831 in Vienna) was a Czech composer of classical music and violinist. He was one of the most popular composers in the 19th century Vienna. Today he is mostly known for his clarinet concertos.

Life
Franz Krommer was born as František Vincenc Kramář in Kamenice. But even his parents were going by a Germanized version of their surname – Krommer. His father was an innkeeper in Kamenice until the family moved to Třebíč in 1773. From 1773 to 1776, Franz studied violin and organ with his uncle, Antonín Mattias Kramář (1742-1804), in Tuřany. He became an organist here along with his uncle in 1777. In 1785 he moved to Vienna and later to Simontornya in Hungary, where he was a violinist and later a Kapellmeister for the orchestra of the Count of Limburg Stirum. In 1790, Krommer was named choirmaster at the Cathedral of Pécs, Hungary. In 1793 he became a Kapellmeister to Count Anton II Grassalkovich. He returned to Vienna in 1795, becoming Maestro di Cappella for Duke Ignaz Fuchs in 1798.

In 1818 Krommer succeeded Leopold Koželuch as composer for the Imperial Court of Austria, the post he held until his death in 1831. He was named a Kapellmeister in 1818. According to Carl Engel he may have been Kapellmeister as early as 1814.

Compositions

His output was prolific, with at least three hundred published compositions in at least 110 opus numbers including at least 9 symphonies, seventy string quartets and many others for winds and strings, about fifteen string quintets and much sonorous, idiomatic and at times powerful music for wind ensemble, for which he is best known today.

Further reading
Padrta, Karel. Franz Krommer (1759–1831); Thematischer Katalog seiner musikalischen Werke. Prague: Supraphon, 1997. 425 pp.  (pbk.)
Zouhar, Zdeněk. František Vincenc Kramář: 1759–1959: výběrová bibliografie. Brno: Universitní Knihovna, 1959.
Occasionally a system of classification of Krommer's works is seen in use based on Padrta's work. For example, the quintet for flute and strings opus 55 in E minor is PadK VII/3, the concerto opus 86 for flute and orchestra (also in E minor, and often played with clarinet solo) is PadK III/16. These examples are taken from the listings at a Czech radio station's website, which gives both the standard opus numbers (when available) and the newer system (Rozhlas D-Dur).

References

External links 
 HOASM biography
 Biography in English
 Biography in French
 
 

1759 births
1831 deaths
18th-century Austrian musicians
18th-century Austrian male musicians
18th-century classical composers
18th-century Bohemian musicians
18th-century violinists
Male classical violinists
Composers for piano
19th-century Austrian musicians
19th-century Austrian male musicians
19th-century Czech musicians
19th-century classical composers
19th-century classical violinists
Austrian people of Czech descent
Czech Classical-period composers
Czech male classical composers
Czech classical violinists
Czech expatriates in Austria
Czech expatriates in Hungary
People from Jihlava District
Musicians from Vienna
Czech Romantic composers
String quartet composers